"I Wanna Thank Ya" is a song by American recording artist Angie Stone. It was produced by Jazze Pha for her third studio album Stone Love (2004) and features guest vocals from rapper Snoop Dogg. An uptempo R&B and neo soul track with heavy funk and disco elements, it samples from Deodato's song "Skatin'" (1980), Joyce Sims's "Come into My Life" (1987), DeBarge's "All This Love" (1982) and The S.O.S. Band's "Take Your Time (Do It Right)" (1980). Released as the album's lead single, it became a top five hit in the Flemish portion of Belgium, while it reached number-one on Billboards Dance Club Songs chart.

Charts

Weekly charts

Release history

References

External links
 

2004 songs
2004 singles
Soul songs
Songs written by Jazze Pha
Songs written by Snoop Dogg
Songs written by El DeBarge
Songs written by Angie Stone
J Records singles
Angie Stone songs